Teshub (also written Teshup, Teššup, or Tešup; cuneiform ; hieroglyphic Luwian , read as Tarhunzas; Ugaritic 𐎚𐎘𐎁, TṮB) was the Hurrian god of sky, thunder, and storms. Taru was the name of a similar Hattic storm god, whose mythology and worship as a primary deity continued and evolved through descendant Luwian and Hittite cultures. In these two, Taru was known as Tarhun / Tarhunt- / Tarhuwant- / Tarhunta, names derived from the Anatolian root *tarh "to defeat, conquer". Taru/Tarhun/Tarhunt was ultimately assimilated into and identified with the Hurrian Teshub around the time of the religious reforms of Muwatalli II, ruler of the Hittite New Kingdom in the early 13th century BCE.  These reforms can generally be categorized as an official incorporation of Hurrian deities into the Hittite pantheon, with a smaller number of important Hurrian gods (like Teshub) being explicitly identified with preexisting major Hittite deities (like Taru).  Teshub reappears in the post-Hurrian cultural successor kingdom of Urartu as Tesheba, one of their chief gods; in Urartian art he is depicted standing on a bull.

Depiction and myths 

Teshub is depicted holding a triple thunderbolt and a weapon, usually an axe (often double-headed) or mace. The sacred bull common throughout Anatolia was his signature animal, represented by his horned crown or by his steeds Šeri and Ḫurri, who drew his chariot or carried him on their backs.

Family 
The Hurrian myth of Teshub's origin—he was conceived when the god Kumarbi bit off and swallowed his father Anu's genitals—is similar to the Greek story of Uranus, Cronus, and Zeus, which is recounted in Hesiod's Theogony. Teshub's brothers are Aranzah (personification of the river Tigris), Ullikummi (stone giant) and Tashmishu.

In the Hurrian schema, Teshub was paired with Hebat the mother goddess; in the Hittite, with the sun goddess Arinniti of Arinna—a cultus of great antiquity which has similarities with the venerated bulls and mothers at Çatalhöyük in the Neolithic era. His son was called Sarruma, the mountain god.

Illuyanka 
According to Hittite myths, one of Teshub's greatest acts was the slaying of the dragon Illuyanka.

Myths also exist of his conflict with the sea creature (possibly a snake or serpent) Hedammu (CTH 348).

See also

Amarna letter EA 19

References

Sky and weather gods
Hurrian deities
Hittite deities
Ugaritic deities
Thunder gods
Cattle deities